This is a list of statutes from 2008 to 2017. For lists of earlier and more recent statutes, see Lists of Statutes of New Zealand.

This is a list of Statutes of New Zealand for the period of the Fifth National Government of New Zealand.

2008

 Taxation (Urgent Measures and Annual Rates) Act 2008
Amendments
 Bail Amendment Act 2008 (Bail Act 2000)
 Education (National Standards) Amendment Act 2008 (Education Act 1989)
 Electricity (Renewable Preference) Repeal Act 2008 (Electricity Act 1992)
 Employment Relations Amendment Act 2008 (Employment Relations Act 2000)
 Energy (Fuels, Levies, and References) Biofuel Obligation Repeal Act 2008 (Energy (Fuels, Levies, and References) Act 1989)
 Sentencing (Offences Against Children) Amendment Act 2008 (Sentencing Act 2002)

2009

 Anti-Money Laundering and Countering Financing of Terrorism Act 2009
 Appropriation (2007/08 Financial Review) Act 2009
 Appropriation (2008/09 Supplementary Estimates) Act 2009
 Appropriation (2009/10 Estimates) Act 2009
 Cluster Munitions Prohibition Act 2009
 Criminal Proceeds (Recovery) Act 2009
 Crown Retail Deposit Guarantee Scheme Act 2009
 Immigration Act 2009
 Imprest Supply (First for 2009/10) Act 2009
 Imprest Supply (Second for 2009/10) Act 2009
 Local Government (Auckland Council) Act 2009
 Local Government (Tamaki Makaurau Reorganisation) Act 2009
 Methodist Church of New Zealand Trusts Act 2009
 Port Nicholson Block (Taranaki Whānui ki Te Upoko o Te Ika) Claims Settlement Act 2009
 Subordinate Legislation (Confirmation and Validation) Act 2009
 Taxation (Budget Tax Measures) Act 2009
 Taxation (Business Tax Measures) Act 2009
 Taxation (Consequential Rate Alignment and Remedial Matters) Act 2009
 Taxation (International Taxation, Life Insurance, and Remedial Matters) Act 2009
 Wanganui District Council (Prohibition of Gang Insignia) Act 2009
 Whakarewarewa and Roto-a-Tamaheke Vesting Act 2009

2010

Appropriation (2008/09 Financial Review) Act 2010
Appropriation (2009/10 Supplementary Estimates) Act 2010
Appropriation (2010/11 Estimates) Act 2010
Canterbury Earthquake Response and Recovery Act 2010
Courts (Remote Participation) Act 2010
Electoral Referendum Act 2010
Electricity Industry Act 2010
Environment Canterbury (Temporary Commissioners and Improved Water Management) Act 2010
Governor-General Act 2010
Insurance (Prudential Supervision) Act 2010
Limitation Act 2010
Local Government (Auckland Transitional Provisions) Act 2010
New Zealand Productivity Commission Act 2010
Ngāti Apa (North Island) Claims Settlement Act 2010
Ngati Tuwharetoa, Raukawa, and Te Arawa River Iwi Waikato River Act 2010
Private Security Personnel and Private Investigators Act 2010
Research, Science, and Technology Act 2010
Rugby World Cup 2011 (Empowering) Act 2010
Sentencing and Parole Reform Act 2010
Subordinate Legislation (Confirmation and Validation) Act 2010
Trans-Tasman Proceedings Act 2010
Unit Titles Act 2010
Utilities Access Act 2010
Waikato-Tainui Raupatu Claims (Waikato River) Settlement Act 2010

2011

Appropriation (2009/10 Financial Review) Act 2011
Appropriation (2010/11 Supplementary Estimates) Act 2011
Appropriation (2011/12 Estimates) Act 2011
Auditor Regulation Act 2011
Canterbury Earthquake Commemoration Day Act 2011
Canterbury Earthquake Recovery Act 2011
Criminal Procedure Act 2011
Duties of Statutory Officers (Census and Other Remedial Provisions) Act 2011
Environmental Protection Authority Act 2011
Financial Markets Authority Act 2011
Freedom Camping Act 2011
Hamilton City Council (Parana Park) Land Vesting Act 2011
Imprest Supply (First for 2011/12) Act 2011
Imprest Supply (Second for 2011/12) Act 2011
Legal Services Act 2011
Local Government Borrowing Act 2011
Māori Purposes Act 2011
Marine and Coastal Area (Takutai Moana) Act 2011
Securities Trustees and Statutory Supervisors Act 2011
Sleepover Wages (Settlement) Act 2011
Student Loan Scheme Act 2011
Subordinate Legislation (Confirmation and Validation) Act 2011
Taxation (Annual Rates and Budget Measures) Act 2011
Taxation (Canterbury Earthquake Measures) Act 2011
Taxation (Tax Administration and Remedial Matters) Act 2011
Video Camera Surveillance (Temporary Measures) Act 2011
Westpac New Zealand Act 2011
Whanganui Iwi (Whanganui (Kaitoke) Prison and Northern Part of Whanganui Forest) On-account Settlement Act 2011
Amendments
Adoption Amendment Act 2011 (Adoption Act 1955)
Aquaculture Reform (Repeals and Transitional Provisions) Amendment Act 2011 (Aquaculture Reform (Repeals and Transitional Provisions) Act 2004)
Bail Amendment Act 2011 (Bail Act 2000)
Care of Children Amendment Act 2011 (Care of Children Act 2004)
Children, Young Persons, and Their Families Amendment Act 2011 (Children, Young Persons, and Their Families Act 1989)
Children, Young Persons, and Their Families Amendment Act (No 2) 2011 (Children, Young Persons, and Their Families Act 1989)
Climate Change Response Amendment Act 2011 (Climate Change Response Act 2002)
Copyright Amendment Act 2011 (Copyright Act 1994)
Copyright (Infringing File Sharing) Amendment Act 2011 (Copyright Act 1994)
Corrections Amendment Act 2011 (Corrections Act 2004)
Crimes Amendment Act 2011 (Crimes Act 1961)
Crimes Amendment Act (No 2) 2011 (Crimes Act 1961)
Crimes Amendment Act (No 3) 2011 (Crimes Act 1961)
Crimes Amendment Act (No 4) 2011 (Crimes Act 1961)
Criminal Disclosure Amendment Act 2011 (Criminal Disclosure Act 2008)
Criminal Procedure (Mentally Impaired Persons) Amendment Act 2011 (Criminal Procedure (Mentally Impaired Persons) Act 2003)
Criminal Proceeds (Recovery) Amendment Act 2011 (Criminal Proceeds (Recovery) Act 2009)
Customs and Excise Amendment Act 2011 (Customs and Excise Act 1996)
Dairy Industry Restructuring (New Sunset Provisions) Amendment Act 2011 (Dairy Industry Restructuring Act 2001)
Disputes Tribunals Amendment Act 2011 (Disputes Tribunals Act 1988)
District Courts Amendment Act 2011 (District Courts Act 1947)
District Courts Amendment Act (No 2) 2011 (District Courts Act 1947)
Domestic Violence Amendment Act 2011 (Domestic Violence Act 1995)
Education Amendment Act 2011 (Education Act 1989)
Education (Freedom of Association) Amendment Act 2011 (Education Act 1989)
Electoral (Administration) Amendment Act 2011 (Electoral Act 1993)
Evidence Amendment Act 2011 (Evidence Act 2006)
Family Courts Amendment Act 2011 (Family Courts Act 1980)
Financial Advisers Amendment Act 2011 (Financial Advisers Act 2008)
Financial Reporting Amendment Act 2011 (Financial Reporting Act 1993)
Fisheries Amendment Act 2011 (Fisheries Act 1996)
Hazardous Substances and New Organisms Amendment Act 2011 (Hazardous Substances and New Organisms Act 1996)
Immigration Amendment Act 2011 (Immigration Act 2009)
Imports and Exports (Restrictions) Amendment Act 2011 (Imports and Exports (Restrictions) Act 1988)
Juries Amendment Act 2011 (Juries Act 1981)
Justices of the Peace Amendment Act 2011 (Justices of the Peace Act 1957)
KiwiSaver Amendment Act 2011 (KiwiSaver Act 2006)
Land Transport Amendment Act 2011 (Land Transport Act 1998)
Land Transport (Road Safety and Other Matters) Amendment Act 2011 (Land Transport Act 1998)
Local Government (Auckland Council) Amendment Act 2011 (Local Government (Auckland Council) Act 2009)
Maori Commercial Aquaculture Claims Settlement Amendment Act 2011 (Maori Commercial Aquaculture Claims Settlement Act 2004)
Maori Fisheries Amendment Act 2011 (Maori Fisheries Act 2004)
Maori Trust Boards Amendment Act 2011 (Maori Trust Boards Act 1955)
Misuse of Drugs Amendment Act 2011 (Misuse of Drugs Act 1975)
Misuse of Drugs Amendment Act (No 2) 2011 (Misuse of Drugs Act 1975)
Misuse of Drugs Amendment Act 1978 Amendment Act 2011 (Misuse of Drugs Amendment Act 1978)
New Zealand Bill of Rights Amendment Act 2011 (New Zealand Bill of Rights Act 1990)
New Zealand Security Intelligence Service Amendment Act 2011 (New Zealand Security Intelligence Service Act 1969)
Ozone Layer Protection Amendment Act 2011 (Ozone Layer Protection Act 1996)
Personal Property Securities Amendment Act 2011 (Personal Property Securities Act 1999)
Policing (Storage of Youth Identifying Particulars) Amendment Act 2011 (Policing Act 2008)
Prisoners' and Victims' Claims Amendment Act 2011 (Prisoners' and Victims' Claims Act 2005)
Privacy Amendment Act 2011 (Privacy Act 1993)
Railways Amendment Act 2011 (Railways Act 2005)
Residential Tenancies Amendment Act 2011 (Residential Tenancies Act 1986)
Resource Management Amendment Act 2011 (Resource Management Act 1991)
Resource Management Amendment Act (No 2) 2011 (Resource Management Act 1991)
Securities Amendment Act 2011 (Securities Act 1978)
Securities Markets Amendment Act 2011(Securities Markets Act 1988)
Sentencing Amendment Act 2011 (Sentencing Act 2002)
Sentencing Amendment Act (No 2) 2011 (Sentencing Act 2002)
Smoke-free Environments (Controls and Enforcement) Amendment Act 2011 (Smoke-free Environments Act 1990)
Social Security Amendment Act 2011 (Social Security Act 1964)
Summary Proceedings Amendment Act 2011 (Summary Proceedings Act 1957)
Summary Proceedings Amendment Act (No 2) 2011 (Summary Proceedings Act 1957)
Tax Administration Amendment Act 2011 (Tax Administration Act 1994)
Te Ture Whenua Maori Amendment Act 2011 (Te Ture Whenua Maori Act 1993)
Telecommunications (TSO, Broadband, and Other Matters) Amendment Act 2011 (Telecommunications Act 2001)
Television New Zealand Amendment Act 2011 (Television New Zealand Act 2003)
Trade Marks Amendment Act 2011 (Trade Marks Act 2002)
Victims' Rights Amendment Act 2011 (Victims' Rights Act 2002)
Weathertight Homes Resolution Services (Financial Assistance Package) Amendment Act 2011 (Weathertight Homes Resolution Services Act 2006)

2012
Antarctica (Environmental Protection: Liability Annex) Amendment Act 2012
Callaghan Innovation Act 2012
Cultural Property (Protection in Armed Conflict) Act 2012
Electronic Identity Verification Act 2012
Exclusive Economic Zone and Continental Shelf (Environmental Effects) Act 2012
Hutt City Council (Graffiti Removal) Act 2012
Identity Information Confirmation Act 2012
Legislation Act 2012
Maraeroa A and B Blocks Claims Settlement Act 2012
Maraeroa A and B Blocks Incorporation Act 2012
Military Manoeuvres Act Repeal Act 2012
National Animal Identification and Tracing Act 2012
National War Memorial Park (Pukeahu) Empowering Act 2012
Nga Wai o Maniapoto (Waipa River) Act 2012
Ngai Tāmanuhiri Claims Settlement Act 2012
Ngāti Mākino Claims Settlement Act 2012
Ngāti Manawa Claims Settlement Act 2012
Ngāti Manuhiri Claims Settlement Act 2012
Ngāti Pāhauwera Treaty Claims Settlement Act 2012
Ngati Porou Claims Settlement Act 2012
Ngāti Whare Claims Settlement Act 2012
Ngāti Whātua Ōrākei Claims Settlement Act 2012
Road User Charges Act 2012
Rongowhakaata Claims Settlement Act 2012
Sale and Supply of Alcohol Act 2012
Search and Surveillance Act 2012
Southland District Council (Stewart Island/Rakiura Visitor Levy) Empowering Act 2012

2013
Auctioneers Act 2013
Family Dispute Resolution Act 2013
Financial Markets Conduct Act 2013
Financial Reporting Act 2013
Game Animal Council Act 2013
Housing Accords and Special Housing Areas Act 2013
Inquiries Act 2013
Kaipara District Council (Validation of Rates and Other Matters) Act 2013
Members of Parliament (Remuneration and Services) Act 2013
Mines Rescue Act 2013
Mokomoko (Restoration of Character, Mana, and Reputation) Act 2013 / Te Ture mō Mokomoko (Hei Whakahoki i te Ihi, te Mana, me te Rangatiratanga) 2013
New Zealand International Convention Centre Act 2013
Ngāti Whātua o Kaipara Claims Settlement Act 2013
Non-bank Deposit Takers Act 2013
Patents Act 2013
Prohibition of Gang Insignia in Government Premises Act 2013
Psychoactive Substances Act 2013
Royal Succession Act 2013
South Taranaki District Council (Cold Creek Rural Water Supply) Act 2013
Waitaha Claims Settlement Act 2013
Waitaki District Council Reserves and Other Land Empowering Act 2013
WorkSafe New Zealand Act 2013

2014
Airports (Cost Recovery for Processing of International Travellers) Act 2014
Arts Council of New Zealand Toi Aotearoa Act 2014
Food Act 2014
Haka Ka Mate Attribution Act 2014
Heritage New Zealand Pouhere Taonga Act 2014
Kaikōura (Te Tai o Marokura) Marine Management Act 2014
Maungaharuru-Tangitū Hapū Claims Settlement Act 2014
New Zealand Mission Trust Board (Otamataha) Empowering Act 2014
Ngā Mana Whenua o Tāmaki Makaurau Collective Redress Act 2014
Ngāti Apa ki te Rā Tō, Ngāti Kuia, and Rangitāne o Wairau Claims Settlement Act 2014
Ngāti Hauā Claims Settlement Act 2014
Ngāti Kōata, Ngāti Rārua, Ngāti Tama ki Te Tau Ihu, and Te Ātiawa o Te Waka-a-Māui Claims Settlement Act 2014
Ngāti Koroki Kahukura Claims Settlement Act 2014
Ngāti Rangiteaorere Claims Settlement Act 2014
Ngāti Rangiwewehi Claims Settlement Act 2014
Ngati Toa Rangatira Claims Settlement Act 2014
Parliamentary Privilege Act 2014
Public Safety (Public Protection Orders) Act 2014
Raukawa Claims Settlement Act 2014
Subantarctic Islands Marine Reserves Act 2014
Sullivan Birth Registration Act 2014
Tapuika Claims Settlement Act 2014
Tasman District Council (Validation and Recovery of Certain Rates) Act 2014
Te Urewera Act 2014
Trade (Safeguard Measures) Act 2014
Tūhoe Claims Settlement Act 2014
Veterans' Support Act 2014
Victims' Orders Against Violent Offenders Act 2014
Vulnerable Children Act 2014
West Coast Wind-blown Timber (Conservation Lands) Act 2014

2015
Arts Centre of Christchurch Trust Act 2015
Christchurch City Council (Rates Validation) Act 2015
Environmental Reporting Act 2015
Harmful Digital Communications Act 2015
Hawke's Bay Regional Planning Committee Act 2015
Health and Safety at Work Act 2015
Land Transport (Speed Limits Validation and Other Matters) Act 2015
New Zealand Flag Referendums Act 2015
Ngāi Takoto Claims Settlement Act 2015
Ngāti Kahu Accumulated Rentals Trust Act 2015
Ngāti Kuri Claims Settlement Act 2015
Reserves and Other Lands Disposal Act 2015
Returning Offenders (Management and Information) Act 2015
Social Security (Clothing Allowances for Orphans and Unsupported Children) Amendment Act 2015
Standards and Accreditation Act 2015
Te Aupouri Claims Settlement Act 2015
Te Kawerau ā Maki Claims Settlement Act 2015
Te Rarawa Claims Settlement Act 2015

2016
Accident Compensation Amendment Act 2016
Burial and Cremation Amendment Act 2016
Canterbury Property Boundaries and Related Matters Act 2016
Child Protection (Child Sex Offender Government Agency Registration) Act 2016
Children, Young Persons, and Their Families Amendment Act (No 2) 2016
Christian Churches New Zealand Property Trust Board Empowering Act 2016
Compensation for Live Organ Donors Act 2016
Copyright Amendment Act 2016
District Court Act 2016
Electronic Courts and Tribunals Act 2016
Environment Canterbury (Transitional Governance Arrangements) Act 2016
Greater Christchurch Regeneration Act 2016
Hineuru Claims Settlement Act 2016
Holidays Amendment Act (No 2) 2016
Home and Community Support (Payment for Travel Between Clients) Settlement Act 2016
Hurunui/Kaikōura Earthquakes Emergency Relief Act 2016
Hurunui/Kaikōura Earthquakes Recovery Act 2016
Interest on Money Claims Act 2016
Judicial Review Procedure Act 2016
Land Transport Amendment Act 2016
Māori Language Act 2016 / Te Ture mō Te Reo Māori 2016
Medicines Amendment Act 2016
Mental Health (Compulsory Assessment and Treatment) Amendment Act 2016
Misuse of Drugs Amendment Act 2016
New Zealand Business Number Act 2016
New Zealand Public Health and Disability (Southern DHB) Elections Act 2016
Ngāruahine Claims Settlement Act 2016
Radiation Safety Act 2016
Rangitāne o Manawatu Claims Settlement Act 2016
Riccarton Racecourse Act 2016
Riccarton Racecourse Development Enabling Act 2016
Senior Courts Act 2016
Smoke-free Environments (Tobacco Standardised Packaging) Amendment Act 2016
Subordinate Legislation Confirmation Act 2016
Taranaki Iwi Claims Settlement Act 2016
Te Atiawa Claims Settlement Act 2016
Trans-Pacific Partnership Agreement Amendment Act 2016
Wellington Town Belt Act 2016

2017

XXXX 

 Energy Resources Levy (1976–1991) Act By Parliamentary Counsel
 Hospitals Act 1957–1993 (by Parliamentary Counsel) Act
 War Funds Act (1915 to 1995) by Parliamentary Counsel Act

References

External links 
The above list may not be current and will contain errors and omissions. For more accurate information see:
 New Zealand Legislation, Parliamentary Counsel Office

Lists of statutes of New Zealand